State Road 575 (SR 575) is a short state road in and near Lacoochee, Florida. At both ends it continues as a county road.

Major intersections

County road extensions

Like many county roads in the state of Florida, it was originally a state highway that was downgraded to a county road during the great renumbering of 1980. CR 575 begins at the intersection of CR 41 (formerly SR 41) and CR 41 Alt. near Blanton, as Trilby Road and winds through rural northeastern Pasco County, first in a north–south direction, then in a more east–west direction. Entering Trilby itself, it crosses the Withlacoochee State Trail, then intersects with US 98 at a blinker-light intersection. At the intersection of US 301 at Trilacoochee it regains the state highway status it held long ago.

 
As SR 575 crosses the Hernando County Line near the Withlacoochee River, it reverts to a county road again on its way to State Road 50.

References

External links

575
575
575
575
575